Blessed Michael may refer to:
Blessed Michał Sopoćko, the Apostle of Divine Mercy
Blessed Michał Kozal, bishop and martyr

See also
Saint Michael